Cisco Sam Adler (born September 6, 1978) is an American musician and record producer.

Personal life

Cisco is married to fashion model Barbara Stoyanoff; they have one child. He is the son of legendary record and film producer Lou Adler.

Career
Adler has collaborated extensively with hip-hop artist Shwayze. Their first single, "Buzzin'," reached number 46 on the Billboard Hot 100, and the follow-up "Corona and Lime" peaked at number 23. They starred in the MTV reality series Buzzin', have appeared on MTV Cribs, and toured with Warped Tour 2008. They worked with DJ Skeet Skeet on a Nike-sponsored workout program entitled Beach Blast by Shwayze.

Other artists with whom Adler has worked include Mod Sun, Tayyib Ali, Mike Posner, Cody Simpson, and The Internet, Wiz Khalifa,  Blackbear, Yung Pinch, Gashi, YG, Pouya, and more.

Solo projects include the mixtapes Pop Shit and Super California Lipstick Sexy Magic Dope Shit.

Adler produced the soundtrack for the 2016 musical comedy television film The Rocky Horror Picture Show: Let's Do the Time Warp Again, which his father Lou originally executive produced as a feature film. He produced and appeared in the film Sweetie Pie.

Legal issues 
Adler was arrested in 2008 for assaulting an employee of the Fargo, North Dakota, club where he and Shwayze were performing but was released shortly after being taken into custody.

Discography

Albums with Whitestarr
Luv Machine (2006)
Fillith Tillith (2007)

Albums with Shwayze

Solo albums
 Aloha (2012)
 Coastin' (2014)

Singles

EPs
Alice in La La Land (2009)
The W's (2011)
Aloha (2012)
One Way (2013)
Mahalo (2013)
Don't Kill My Buzz... (2017)

Mixtapes
Rich Girls (2008)
Super California Lipstick Sexy Magic Dope Shit (2010)

Music videos

Guest appearances
Andre Legacy – Bender (feat. Cisco Adler)
Andre Legacy – DJ Dying (feat. Cisco Adler)
Beardo – Back to the Valley (feat. Cisco Adler)
Mr. Lil' One/Lil' Uno – Love Like Magic (feat. Cisco Adler)
Mickey Avalon – What Do You Say (feat. Cisco Adler, Dirt Nasty & Andre Legacy)
The Pricks – Brown Eyes (feat. Cisco Adler)
Stallionaires – Summer Love Child (feat. Cisco Adler)
Wiz Khalifa – Hey Girl (feat. Cisco Adler)
Jesse Scott – Hands Up (feat. Cisco Adler)
Big B – My Baby Says (feat. Cisco Adler)*
 MOD SUN – Jam On! (feat. Cisco Adler)
 Kidd Russell – Are We having fun yet (feat. Cisco Adler)
 Kidd Russell – Wake Up (feat. Cisco Adler)

Production discography
Studio albums
Shwayze – Shwayze
Shwayze – Let It Beat
Shwayze – Rich Girls
Cody Simpson – Free

Selected songs
Chris Young the Rapper – 619
Get Romantic
Stadium Rap
Chris Young the Rapper – The Value Pack
Get It RIght
Mickey Avalon – Mickey Avalon
Jane Fonda
Mr. Right
Mickey Avalon – Electric Gigolo
What Do You Say
Stroke Me
Mike Posner – 31 Minutes to Takeoff
Do U Wanna?
Gone in September
Wiz Khalifa
Hey Girl
Dirt Nasty – Nasty As I Wanna Be
Big in Japan
So L.A.
Lookin' for a Nasty Girl
Big B – Good Times & Bad Advice
My Baby Says

Filmography
MTV Video Music Awards 2008
Tropic Thunder (2008) (soundtrack)
Buzzin (2008) (TV)
The Rock Life (2007)
27 Miles (2005)
Grind (2003) (Soundtrack)
A Token for Your Thoughts (2003) (soundtrack)
Sweetie Pie (2000)

References

External links

Official Whitestarr website
Cisco Adler's Blog on Eat Skeet
VH1's The Rock Life

1978 births
American hip hop record producers
Film producers from California
American rock singers
American socialites
Jewish American musicians
Living people
Musicians from Los Angeles
Participants in American reality television series
Singers from California
21st-century American singers
Record producers from California
21st-century American Jews